Dustin Michael Hermanson (born December 21, 1972) is an American former right-handed relief pitcher in Major League Baseball (MLB). Hermanson pitched for several MLB teams between 1995 and 2006. He had his best season with the 2005 Chicago White Sox team that won the World Series; he had 34 saves that year before sustaining a season-ending back injury in September.

Early life
Hermanson was born in Springfield, Ohio, and he attended Kenton Ridge High School in Springfield. He played three seasons of college baseball for Kent State, where his fastball increased in speed from 88 mph to 96 mph. He was a finalist for the Golden Spikes Award in 1994. 
He was selected in the first round of the 1994 Major League Baseball Draft with the third overall selection by the San Diego Padres. Hermanson split the 1994 season between Double-A and Triple-A before making his MLB debut in 1995.

MLB career
Hermanson played for the Padres and their Triple-A affiliate, the Las Vegas Stars, in 1995 and 1996. He then played for the Montreal Expos for four seasons before moving around to the St. Louis Cardinals, Boston Red Sox, San Francisco Giants, and Chicago White Sox. With Montreal and St. Louis, Hermanson was mostly a starting pitcher, while he moved mostly into a relief role with the latter three teams. He served as the closer for the White Sox during most of their 2005 championship season, saving 34 games before being replaced by rookie Bobby Jenks in late September when he injured his back. Hermanson had a 2.04 ERA at the time of his injury.

On October 30, 2006, the White Sox declined a 2007 option for $3.65 million on Hermanson. He received a $500,000 payout. He signed a minor league deal with a spring training invitation with the Reds on March 1, 2007. Hermanson was discussed as a possible closer for the Reds, but he had a 7.36 ERA in spring training and the Reds asked him to go to the minor leagues. Hermanson asked to be released instead of reporting to Triple-A. 

By June 2007, Hermanson said he was probably finished playing baseball. He was dealing with a bad back, and he said he looked forward to being more available to his children.

References

External links

1972 births
Living people
Baseball players from Ohio
American expatriate baseball players in Canada
Major League Baseball pitchers
San Diego Padres players
Montreal Expos players
Boston Red Sox players
St. Louis Cardinals players
San Francisco Giants players
Chicago White Sox players
Kent State Golden Flashes baseball players
Sportspeople from Springfield, Ohio
Wichita Wranglers players
Las Vegas Stars (baseball) players
Gulf Coast Red Sox players
Pawtucket Red Sox players
Fresno Grizzlies players
Charlotte Knights players